Janette Husárová and Paola Suárez were the defending champions, but chose not to participate that year.

Mariya Koryttseva and Lilia Osterloh won in the final 6–3, 6–4, against Martina Müller and Barbora Záhlavová-Strýcová.

Seeds

Draw

Draw

External links
Draw

WTA Auckland Open
2008 WTA Tour